The 2022 Zandvoort FIA Formula 2 round was a motor racing event held between 2 and 4 September 2022 at Circuit Zandvoort, Zandvoort, Netherlands. It was the twelfth round of the 2022 Formula 2 Championship and was held in support of the 2022 Dutch Grand Prix.

Classification

Qualifying
Felipe Drugovich achieved back-to-back pole positions with a lap time over two tenths ahead of Spa-Francorchamps feature race winner Jack Doohan and Logan Sargeant.

Sprint race

Feature race 
The race was red-flagged after Logan Sargeant's opening-lap crash damaged the barriers. The race was restarted after twenty-five minutes.

Notes:
 – David Beckmann and Roy Nissany both received ten-second time penalties for driving erratically under safety car conditions.

Standings after the event 

Drivers' Championship standings

Teams' Championship standings

 Note: Only the top five positions are included for both sets of standings.

See also 
 2022 Dutch Grand Prix
 2022 Zandvoort Formula 3 round

Notes

References

External links 
 

Zandvoort
Zandvoort Formula 2 round
Formula 2